Peter Schmid (born 27 April 1949) is an Austrian former freestyle and medley swimmer. He competed in two events at the 1968 Summer Olympics.

References

External links
 

1949 births
Living people
Austrian male freestyle swimmers
Austrian male medley swimmers
Olympic swimmers of Austria
Swimmers at the 1968 Summer Olympics
Sportspeople from Klagenfurt